This list comprises all players who have participated in at least one league match for Hollywood United Hitmen since the team's first season in the USL Premier Development League in 2009. Players who were on the roster but never played a first team game are not listed; players who appeared for the team in other competitions (US Open Cup, etc.) but never actually made an USL appearance are noted at the bottom of the page where appropriate.

Note: this list does not contain players who played for the senior Hollywood United team, which is owned by the same parent organization, but is a separate playing team.

A
  Ferguson Agwu
  Steven Akers
  Earl Alexander
  Chris Arceo

B
  Shalom Bako
  Mike Barbeito
  Diego Barrera
  Emanuel Bentil
  Federico Bianchi
  Nick Blanco
  Tristan Bowen

C
  Victor Cerna
  Jaime Chavez
  Rene Corona

D
  Shahryar Dastan

F
  Anthony Flores
  Adriano Francisco

G
  Leonard Griffin
  Laurent Grill

H
  Missoum Harbouche
  Peter Hazdovac
  Bryan Hernandez

J
  Terrence Johnson

K
  Nick Kohlschreiber

M
  Esaul Mendoza
  Ricardo Mendoza
  Edwin Miranda
  Jose Miranda
  Mutala Mohammed
  Carlos Morales
  Jose Munoz

O
  Armando Ochoa
  Diego Oliveira

P
  Kyle Patterson
  Tony Peiffer

R
  Albert Racca
  Milan Radovic
  Erik Robert
  Ruben Rodriguez
  Shaun Russell

S
  Estuardo Sanchez
  Israel Sesay
  Amir Shafii
  Omid Shokoufandeh
  Oscar Sims
  Willie Sims
  Shay Spitz

V
  Julian Valentin
  Goran Vujanovic

W
  Brent Whitfield

Sources

2010 Hollywood United Hitmen stats
2009 Hollywood United Hitmen stats

References

Hollywood United Hitmen
 
Association football player non-biographical articles